Aragvispiri is a village in north-eastern Georgia. It is located in the Dusheti District, Mtskheta-Mtianeti region.

References 

Villages in Mtskheta-Mtianeti